Jack Beats is an English electronic music project from London, originally formed in 2007 by DJ Plus One (from the Scratch Perverts) and Beni G (from The Mixologists), both of which are multiple DJ champions and award-winning DJs. The Jack Beats sound is known for wobbly basslines, big breakdowns and edgy a capellas which are cut, copied, and pasted together.

History
Jack Beats has been heavily championed on the electro scene by British disc jockeys Kissy Sell Out and Hervé. They perform regularly at club nights throughout the world, as well as at many popular festivals, including Coachella, Fuji Rock Festival, Glastonbury, EDC, and Sónar. Additionally, they have released music on labels including Owsla, Rinse, Night Bass, and Columbia Records.

Members
Beni G (Ben Geffin) is a British DJ. He is one-half member of The Mixologists.

DJ Plus One (Niall Dailly) is a Scottish DJ. He won the DMC World DJ Championships in 2001. He is a former DJ on London's Kiss radio station.  Dailly tours regularly with the Scratch Perverts.

Starting in 2015, Jack Beats no longer performs as a duo. Dially is no longer present at performances. Geffin will frequently have collaborators on stage, such as AC Slater (Head of the Night Bass label that Jack Beats frequently releases on) or Dillon Nathaniel. Additionally, new Jack Beats music appears to be produced by only one member of the duo (likely Geffin, as other first-person social posts reference him exclusively). No formal announcement regarding why has been made by either member.

Discography

Singles and EPs

Compilations

Promotional songs

Mixtapes

Mixes

Remixes

References

External links
 
 
 
 Jack Beats Beatport
 Jack Beats OWSLA
 Jack Beats Soundcloud

2007 establishments in England
21st-century English musicians
Dubstep music groups
Electro house musicians
English dance music groups
English house music duos
Electronic dance music duos
Musical groups established in 2007
Musical groups from London
Owsla artists